Monte San Giusto is a comune (municipality) in the Province of Macerata in the Italian region Marche, located about  south of Ancona and about  southeast of Macerata.

Monte San Giusto borders the following municipalities: Corridonia, Monte San Pietrangeli, Montegranaro, Morrovalle.

Among the churches in Monte San Giusto are:
 Santa Maria della Pietà in Telusiano
 Chiesa Collegiata di Santo Stefano
 Santa Maria delle Panette

References

Cities and towns in the Marche